Oruzhba is a rural locality (a selo) and the administrative centre of Oruzhbinsky Selsoviet, Magaramkentsky District, Republic of Dagestan, Russia. The population was 1,839 as of 2010. There are 41 streets.

Geography 
Oruzhba is located 23 km northeast of Magaramkent (the district's administrative centre) by road. Klichkhan and Bugdatepe are the nearest rural localities.

Nationalities 
Lezgins live there.

References 

Rural localities in Magaramkentsky District